Roland Günther (born 11 December 1962) is a German cyclist. He won the bronze medal in the team pursuit along with Rolf Gölz, Reinhard Alber and Michael Marx in the 1984 Summer Olympics.

References

1962 births
Living people
German male cyclists
Cyclists at the 1984 Summer Olympics
Olympic cyclists of West Germany
Olympic bronze medalists for West Germany
People from Bergstraße (district)
Sportspeople from Darmstadt (region)
Cyclists from Hesse
Medalists at the 1984 Summer Olympics
Olympic medalists in cycling